Pseudopeziza is a genus of fungi in the family Dermateaceae. The genus contains three species.

See also
 List of Dermateaceae genera

References

External links
Pseudopeziza at Index Fungorum

Dermateaceae genera
Taxa named by Karl Wilhelm Gottlieb Leopold Fuckel